"Love Chaser" is the 1986 single released by the Swedish hard rock band Europe. It was taken from the album The Final Countdown, and was released only in Japan in the soundtrack album of the Japanese movie Pride One. The track on the B-side of the single was "Carrie". Next year the single was reissued in Japan and was entitled "Carrie" with "Carrie" on the A-side. The reissue had the same catalogue number (VIPX-1849) as the first release.

The song was written by vocalist Joey Tempest in 1985, and was first played on a tour in Sweden the same year, before it was recorded and included on the Final Countdown album in 1986.

Japanese pro wrestler Yoshiaki Yatsu used the song as his entrance theme in All Japan Pro Wrestling.

Personnel
Joey Tempest − vocals
John Norum − guitars
John Levén − bass guitar
Mic Michaeli − keyboards
Ian Haugland − drums

References

1986 singles
Europe (band) songs
Songs written by Joey Tempest